= Gregory W. Sullivan =

Massachusetts politician (born 1952)

Member of the Massachusetts House of Representatives from the 17th Norfolk district
- In office 1975–1990

Personal details
- Born: January 29, 1952 (age 74) Portsmouth, Virginia, US
- Education: Harvard College

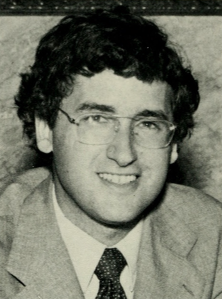
Portrait of Gregory W. Sullivan, member of the Massachusetts House of Representatives

Gregory W. Sullivan (born January 29, 1952) was an American politician who was the member of the Massachusetts House of Representatives from the 17th Norfolk district.
